The Ikarus 452 was an experimental jet aircraft built in Yugoslavia in 1953. It was a stubby mid-wing cantilever monoplane of pod-and-boom configuration, with twin jets mounted one atop the other at the rear of the fuselage nacelle, with separate intakes for the lower engine (in the wing roots) and the upper engine (on the sides of the rear fuselage). The twin tails and horizontal stabiliser were carried at the ends of booms that extended rearwards from the wings, with a short fin extending from the top of the rear fuselage to also meet the stabiliser. The flying surfaces were sharply swept, and construction throughout was of an experimental alloy.

Flight testing was carried out from mid 1953, with experience from the programme providing a basis for the production of the Soko Galeb.

Specifications

See also

 Ikarus 451M (first domestically-built Yugoslav jet aircraft)
 Ikarus 453

References

External links
 Ikarus 452 (Specifications, photos...)
 Ikarus 452 photo
 Ikarus Ik-452-2 photo

1950s Yugoslav experimental aircraft
Ikarus aircraft
Twinjets
Mid-wing aircraft
Aircraft first flown in 1953